Poetic Meter and Poetic Form is a book by Paul Fussell, published by McGraw Hill in 1965, and later as a revised edition in 1979.

Fussell distinguishes four types of meter:
 Syllabic
 Accentual 
 Accentual-syllabic 
 Quantitative

Notes
 page 6.

Poetic rhythm
1965 non-fiction books
Poetic forms
Books about poetry
McGraw-Hill books